Molly McGee may refer to:

 Molly McGee (gridiron football) (1952–1994), a National Football League running back
 Molly McGee, a main character of Fibber McGee and Molly, a 1935 American radio comedy series
 Molly McGee, a main character of The Ghost and Molly McGee, a 2021 American animated television series